Wainaku is a census-designated place (CDP) in Hawaii County, Hawaii, United States. The population was 1,147 at the 2020 census.

Geography

Wainaku is located on the east side of the island of Hawaii at  (19.747258, -155.100954). It is on the west side of Hilo Bay and is bordered by Hilo to the south and Paukaa to the north. Hawaii Route 19 is the main road through the community.

Demographics

As of the census of 2000, there were 1,227 people, 422 households, and 316 families residing in the CDP. The racial makeup of the CDP was 19.72% White, 0.16% African American, 0.41% Native American, 45.97% Asian, 6.44% Pacific Islander, 0.24% from other races, and 27.06% from two or more races. Hispanic or Latino of any race were 8.48% of the population.

There were 422 households, out of which 27.0% had children under the age of 18 living with them, 53.1% were married couples living together, 15.2% had a female householder with no husband present, and 24.9% were non-families. 21.1% of all households were made up of individuals, and 11.1% had someone living alone who was 65 years of age or older.  The average household size was 2.91 and the average family size was 3.36.

In the CDP the population was spread out, with 22.0% under the age of 18, 8.9% from 18 to 24, 23.6% from 25 to 44, 24.2% from 45 to 64, and 21.4% who were 65 years of age or older.  The median age was 43 years. For every 100 females, there were 97.9 males.  For every 100 females age 18 and over, there were 96.9 males.

The median income for a household in the CDP was $42,292, and the median income for a family was $52,946. Males had a median income of $29,792 versus $23,750 for females. The per capita income for the CDP was $19,296.  About 6.9% of families and 12.5% of the population were below the poverty line, including 23.0% of those under age 18 and 10.2% of those age 65 or over.

See also

 List of places in Hawaii

References

External links

Census-designated places in Hawaii County, Hawaii
Populated places on Hawaii (island)
Populated coastal places in Hawaii